Jonathan Sackner-Bernstein (born 27 January 1961) is an American physician. He has published more than 80 scientific articles, which have been cited more than 4,000 times.  His research has ranged from cardiac care to the efficacy of drugs. His research led to increased scrutiny of Nesiritide, a widely marketed drug, which led to its decline in its use.

Education
Sackner-Bernstein graduated from the University of Pennsylvania's Moore School of Electrical Engineering in 1983 (BSEE),. He completed his MD from Jefferson Medical College, during which he moonlit writing code. He completed a residency in internal medicine and subsequently cardiology at Mount Sinai Hospital in New York. In addition, Sackner-Bernstein completed a research fellowship in heart failure under Milton Packer at Mount Sinai.

Academic, clinical and research experience
Sackner-Bernstein joined the Columbia University faculty in 1993 in the Division of Circulatory Physiology, where he established its clinical research program. He accumulated a large experience with the beta-blocker carvedilol prior to the application by its developer (GlaxoSmithKline) to the US Food and Drug Administration (FDA).

His most cited research focused on whether the newly marketed heart failure drug nesiritide (hr-BNP, Natrecor) was safe and effective, with a call for large-scale clinical trials prior to widespread use. While nesiritide was projected to generate $1 billion in sales in 2006, these studies triggered controversy  that eventually led to markedly lower use by physicians.

Other frequently cited articles include work on Carvedilol  and cardiac hypertrophy.
  
He is also the author of a book on heart disease, Before It Happens To You.

US government projects
Sackner-Bernstein joined the FDA in 2008 as Associate Center Director, leading Post Market Operations as well as Technology and Innovation programs. As the Center's first Associate Center Director for Technology and Innovation, Sackner-Bernstein launched the Innovation Initiative in 2011, which subsequently led to the Early Feasibility Program and laid the foundation for the Breakthrough Device Program.
 
He also helped establish a formal relationship between FDA and DARPA (Defense Advanced Research Projects Agency), then serving as architect for the initial Entrepreneurs-in-Residence Program. sponsored by the  White House Office of Science and Technology Policy (OSTP)

Commercial projects
From late 2018 to mid 2019, Sackner-Bernstein served as Chief Medical Officer and EVP, Clinical and Regulatory Affairs for ROX Medical.

References

External links 
 Personal website, jsbmd.com
 “Science 2.0” 1972 Dolphins vs 2007 Patriots 30 January 2008
 TED Profile and Link to TEDx Talk

American cardiologists
1961 births
Living people
Thomas Jefferson University alumni
Jefferson Medical College alumni
21st-century American inventors